Apterolarnaca is a genus of Orthopterans, sometimes known as 'leaf-folding crickets' in the subfamily Gryllacridinae, tribe Ametrini and genus group Apotrechae Cadena-Castañeda, 2019.  Records of occurrence are from southern China and Vietnam.

The prefix "Aptero-" means that these Orthopterans are similar to the genus  Larnaca, but have secondarily evolved without wings (becoming apterous).  There are a number of similar genera, described from Vietnam by AV Gorochov, and the Orthoptera Species File indicates that other locality records and possibly other species have yet to be discovered in the Indo-China region.

Species 
The Orthoptera Species File lists:
subgenus Apterolarnaca Gorochov, 2004
 Apterolarnaca apta Gorochov, 2004
 Apterolarnaca huanglianensis Bian & Lu, 2021
 Apterolarnaca nigrifrontis Bian & Shi, 2016
 Apterolarnaca quadrimaculata Bian & Shi, 2016
 Apterolarnaca truncatoloba (Li & Liu, 2015)
 Apterolarnaca ulla Gorochov, 2004type species (locality: Fan Si Pan Mountain, Sa Pa District, Lao Cai Province, Vietnam)
subgenus Bianigryllacris
Auth. Cadena-Castañeda, 2019; all from China
 Apterolarnaca biloba (Liu, Bi & Zhang, 2010)
 Apterolarnaca digitata (Liu & Bi, 2008)
 Apterolarnaca fallax (Liu & Bi, 2008)
 Apterolarnaca nigrigeniculata (Liu & Yin, 2002)
 Apterolarnaca parvospinus (Liu & Yin, 2002)
 Apterolarnaca quadrata (Li & Liu, 2015)
 Apterolarnaca tenuispinacia Lu, Zhang & Bian, 2022
 Apterolarnaca transversa (Liu, Bi & Zhang, 2010)
 Apterolarnaca trilobus (Bian & Shi, 2014)
 Apterolarnaca xinganensis Lu, Zhang & Bian, 2022

References

External links

Ensifera genera
Gryllacrididae
Orthoptera of Indo-China